The following elections occurred in the year 1869.



North America

Canada
 1869 Newfoundland general election

United States
 1869 New York state election
 United States Senate election in New York, 1869

Europe

United Kingdom
 1869 Blackburn by-election

France
 1869 French legislative election

Africa
 1869 Liberian general election

See also
 :Category:1869 elections

1869
Elections